Rodney Durbach (born 18 April 1972 in Potchefstroom, South Africa) is a professional squash player from South Africa.

Durbach won a bronze medal in the mixed doubles at the 1998 Commonwealth Games, partnering Natalie Grainger. He reached a career-high world ranking of World No. 23 in 2002.

External links 
 Profile at Squash South Africa website 
 Profile at psa-squash.com 
 

1972 births
Living people
South African male squash players
Commonwealth Games bronze medallists for South Africa
Commonwealth Games medallists in squash
Squash players at the 1998 Commonwealth Games
African Games bronze medalists for South Africa
African Games medalists in squash
People from Potchefstroom
Competitors at the 2003 All-Africa Games
Competitors at the 2005 World Games
20th-century South African people
21st-century South African people
Medallists at the 1998 Commonwealth Games